Yasmin Ali (born 13 January 1990), an Egyptian Singer, Works as a Soloist in the Egyptian Opera House and an actress in the actor Muhammad Sobhi's acting squad.

Early life 
Yasmin was born in Mahmudiya, Beheira, and was raised in Sidi Gaber, Alexandria. She has been singing since her childhood. Her first concert at the age of 8 was at the opening of the Anfoushi Culture Palace until she entered the Institute of Arab Music for one year.

Artworks 
 Yamiat Wanis Series ( Singer - Actress)
 El Hykaiah Song (lyrics by Ahmed Hasan)
 Etkhalaana doaaf (song)
 Hob zaman (song)

Awards 
 Best Voice Award at the level of the schools of the Republic (1996 and 1997). 
 Best Song Award for Quds (1996) at the Festival of Culture Palaces at the Republic level.
 Dr. Ahmed Zewail Award (Artistic Creativity Award as Best Voice in the Cairo Opera House) 2006.

References

External links 
 

1990 births
Egyptian actresses
Egyptian women singers
Living people